1,1-Diphenylethylene is an aromatic hydrocarbon with chemical formula CH.

Properties
1,1-Diphenylethylene mediates the radical polymerization of methyl acrylate or styrene. Meditation by 1,1-Diphenylethylene generates low molecular weight polymer by a termination reaction. Dibenzofulvene is an analogue of a 1,1-Diphenylethylene.

Synthesis 
1,1-Diphenylethylene is technical prepared by alkylating benzene by styrene in presence of a zeolite beta and subsequent dehydrogenation.

 styrene + benzene → 1,1-diphenylethane → 1,1-diphenylethylene + H

See also 
 Dibenzofulvene
 Stilbene

References

Phenyl compounds
Vinylidene compounds